Spin-up refers to the process of a hard disk drive or optical disc drive accelerating its platters or inserted optical disc from a stopped state to an operational speed. The period of time taken by the drive to perform this process is referred to as its spin-up time, the average of which is reported by hard disks as a S.M.A.R.T. attribute. The required operational speed depends on the design of the disk drive. Typical speeds of hard disks have been 2400, 3600, 4200, 5400, 7200, 10000 and 15000 revolutions per minute (RPM).  Achieving such speeds can require a significant portion of the available power budget of a computer system, and so application of power to the disks must be carefully controlled. Operational speed of optical disc drives may vary depending on type of disc and mode of operation (see Constant linear velocity).

Spin-up of hard disks generally occurs at the very beginning of the computer boot process.  However, most modern computers have the ability to stop a drive while the machine is already running as a means of energy conservation or noise reduction.  If a machine is running and requires access to a stopped drive, then a delay is incurred while the drive is spun up. It also depends on the type of mechanism used within.

A drive in the process of being spun up needs more energy input than a drive that is already spinning at operation speeds, since more effort is required for the electric motor to accelerate the platters, as opposed to maintaining their speed.

Staggered spin-up

Staggered Spin-up (SSU) and Power-Up In Standby (PUIS) are features that can help control spin-up of multiple drives within a computer system or a disk subsystem. Both are defined in the ATA Specifications Standards.

Staggered Spin-up (SSU) was introduced into SATA revision 2.5 in 2005. SSU allows a SATA host bus adapter to spin up hard drives in a sequential manner. Hard drive spin-up requires more power than maintaining operating rotational speed and staggering hard drive spin up in a multiple hard drive system reduces the maximum power needed for hard disk startup. The timing for sequential spin ups is set either by waiting a set amount of time for each disk to spin up, or by waiting for each disk to indicate that it is spun up and ready.

Power-up in standby (PUIS) (also called PM2) is used on some Serial ATA (SATA) and Parallel ATA (sometimes called PATA or IDE) hard disk drives. PUIS requires BIOS and/or driver support to use. When power is applied to the hard disk drive, the drive will not spin-up until a PUIS Spin-Up command is issued. The computer system BIOS or RAID controller must issue the command to tell the drive(s) to spin-up before they can be accessed. PUIS can be enabled by tools such as hdparm for drives which support this feature.

References

Booting
Hard disk drives